Johnnie Joseph Tising (October 9, 1903 – September 5, 1967) was a pitcher in Major League Baseball who appeared in ten games (six starts) for the 1936 Pittsburgh Pirates.

Prior to his major league career, Tising pitched for the University of Denver.

References

External links

1903 births
1967 deaths
Major League Baseball pitchers
Pittsburgh Pirates players
Baseball players from Missouri
Denver Pioneers baseball players
People from Moniteau County, Missouri